Dawson is a borough in Fayette County, Pennsylvania, United States. The population was 352 at the 2020 census, a decline from the figure of 367 tabulated in 2010.

Geography
Dawson is located in northern Fayette County at  (40.047892, -79.658659), on the north bank of the Youghiogheny River. Pennsylvania Route 819 passes through the center of town, crossing the Youghiogheny into the unincorporated community of Liberty on the other side. PA 819 leads northeast  to Scottdale and south  to Vanderbilt.

Smiley Run joins the Youghiogheny River on the west side of the Borough.

Surrounding and adjacent neighborhoods
Dawson's only land border is with Lower Tyrone Township to the north, east and west.  Across the Youghiogheny River to the south, Dawson runs adjacent with Dunbar Township.

Demographics

As of the census of 2000, there were 451 people, 183 households, and 120 families residing in the borough. The population density was 2,692.6 people per square mile (1,024.3/km²). There were 205 housing units at an average density of 1,223.9 per square mile (465.6/km²). The racial makeup of the borough is 99.78% White, 0.22% African American, 0.00% Native American, 0.00% Asian, 0.00% Pacific Islander, 0.00% from other races, and 0.00% from two or more races. 0.00% of the population are Hispanic or Latino of any race.

There were 183 households, out of which 27.9% had children under the age of 18 living with them, 53.6% were married couples living together, 8.7% had a female householder with no husband present, and 34.4% were non-families. 30.6% of all households were made up of individuals, and 16.4% had someone living alone who was 65 years of age or older. The average household size was 2.46 and the average family size was 3.13.

In the borough the population was spread out, with 24.4% under the age of 18, 8.4% from 18 to 24, 27.9% from 25 to 44, 24.8% from 45 to 64, and 14.4% who were 65 years of age or older. The median age was 38 years. For every 100 females, there were 86.4 males. For every 100 females age 18 and over, there were 83.3 males.

The median income for a household in the borough was $27,500, and the median income for a family was $30,938. Males had a median income of $27,292 versus $25,000 for females. The per capita income for the borough was $12,753. About 14.2% of families and 16.4% of the population were below the poverty line, including 23.7% of those under age 18 and 11.0% of those age 65 or over.

Landmarks
The Dawson Historic District and Philip G. Cochran Memorial United Methodist Church, a gothic-style structure, are listed on the National Register of Historic Places.

Education
Dawson Borough is served by the Connellsville Area School District.

Municipal services
The borough has sewage treatment services provided by the Yough Sanitary Authority.

History
The land where Dawson was developed had belonged to John Smilie, who held multiple public offices in the government of Pennsylvania and was a member of Congress when he died in December 1812. The property remained in a trust as a part of Smilie's estate,  until his last child died in 1851, when the property was sold.

The "bottom land" where Dawson is situated was acquired by John Smilie's granddaughter, Sarah Huston Dawson, and her second husband, George Dawson.

The Smilie farm, except the river bottom, was sold to Stewart Strickler. The bottom land was sold to George Dawson, who used it for purposes of cultivation. The Pittsburgh and Connellsville Railroad was located through the tract, and upon the opening of the line Dawson's Station was established at this point. A post office was established at the same time.

The property passed, in the division of the Dawson estate, to Mrs. Alfred [Elizabeth Dawson] Howell, and in 1866 a town plat was laid out and surveyed by Martin Dickson for Mr. Howell.

Alfred Howell arranged for the tract to be duly surveyed and laid out into building lots, and so conducted his enterprise as in the course of a few years to erect a prosperous and desirable village, with churches, public schools, etc., upon what was before, and but for his business foresight and energy would have remained, merely an uninhabitable portion of an old farm.

References

External links
 Fayette County Portal

Populated places established in 1866
Pittsburgh metropolitan area
Boroughs in Fayette County, Pennsylvania
1866 establishments in Pennsylvania